James Wells may refer to:
 James B. Wells Jr. (1850–1923), American judge and Democratic politician
 James D. Wells (politician) (1928–2010), American politician from Iowa
 James D. Wells (physicist), American physicist
 James L. Wells (1843–1928), American businessman and politician
 James Lesesne Wells (1902–1993), African-American graphic artist and painter
 James M. Wells III (born c. 1948), American businessman
 James Madison Wells (1808–1899), governor of Louisiana
 James Monroe Wells (1837–1918), American author, soldier, and politician
 James Murray Wells (born 1983), English entrepreneur
 James Pearson Wells (1822–1896), Ontario farmer and political figure
 James Wells (British politician), British politician and MEP
 James Wells (cricketer), English cricketer

See also
Jim Wells (disambiguation)